Edward J. Dee, Jr. (born February 3, 1940), publishing as Ed Dee, is an American author of crime fiction.

Dee was born in Yonkers, New York on February 3, 1940. He graduated from Sacred Heart High School, then served two years in the United States Army. In 1962 in joined the New York City Police Department (NYPD). He earned a BA from Fordham University. 

Dee retired from the NYPD as a lieutenant in 1982 and then he began to write. He earned an MFA in creative writing from Arizona State University in 1992. His first novel, 14 Peck Slip, was named a notable book of the year in 1994 by The New York Times. Bronx Angel (1995), Little Boy Blue (1997), Nightbird (1999), and The Con Man's Daughter (2003) followed.

Panek identifies nostalgia for police traditions as a major theme of Dee's oeuvre.

Works

References 

1940 births
Living people
20th-century American novelists
Writers from Delaware
United States Army soldiers
New York City Police Department officers
Fordham University alumni
Arizona State University alumni
People from Yonkers, New York
21st-century American novelists
American male novelists
20th-century American male writers
21st-century American male writers
Novelists from New York (state)
American crime writers
American mystery writers